{{DISPLAYTITLE:C11H14O2}}
The molecular formula C11H14O2 (molar mass: 178.23 g/mol) may refer to:

 Actinidiolide
 para-tert-Butylbenzoic acid
 Methyl eugenol
 Methyl isoeugenol
 2-Phenethyl propionate
 Wieland–Miescher ketone

Molecular formulas